The 1988 NCAA Men's Water Polo Championship was the 20th annual NCAA Men's Water Polo Championship to determine the national champion of NCAA men's collegiate water polo. Tournament matches were played at the Belmont Plaza Pool in Long Beach, California during December 1988.

California defeated UCLA in the final, 14–11, to win their eighth national title. Coached by Pete Cutino, the Golden Bears finished the season 33–3.

The Most Outstanding Player of the tournament was Kirk Everist (California). An All-Tournament Team of seven players was also named. 

The tournament's leading scorer, with 12 goals, was Kyle Kopp from Long Beach State.

Qualification
Since there has only ever been one single national championship for water polo, all NCAA men's water polo programs (whether from Division I, Division II, or Division III) were eligible. A total of 8 teams were invited to contest this championship. Arkansas–Little Rock, who appeared for the first time this year, was the first team from the Southern United States to qualify for the tournament.

Bracket
Site: Belmont Plaza Pool, Long Beach, California

{{8TeamBracket-Consols
| team-width=150
| RD3=First round
| RD4=Championship semifinals
| RD2=Consolation semifinals
| RD5=Championship
| RD5b=Third place
| RD1=Fifth place
| RD1b=Seventh place

| RD3-seed1= | RD3-team1=California | RD3-score1=17
| RD3-seed2= | RD3-team2=Arkansas–Little Rock | RD3-score2=6
| RD3-seed3= | RD3-team3=Stanford | RD3-score3=5
| RD3-seed4= | RD3-team4=Long Beach State | RD3-score4=4
| RD3-seed5= | RD3-team5=USC | RD3-score5=13
| RD3-seed6= | RD3-team6=UC Irvine | RD3-score6=11
| RD3-seed7= | RD3-team7=UCLA | RD3-score7=11
| RD3-seed8= | RD3-team8= Navy  | RD3-score8=3

| RD4-seed1= | RD4-team1=California | RD4-score1=10
| RD4-seed2= | RD4-team2=Stanford | RD4-score2=6
| RD4-seed3= | RD4-team3=USC | RD4-score3=10
| RD4-seed4= | RD4-team4=UCLA | RD4-score4=13

| RD2-seed1= | RD2-team1=Arkansas–Little Rock | RD2-score1=10
| RD2-seed2= | RD2-team2=Long Beach State | RD2-score2=13| RD2-seed3= | RD2-team3=UC Irvine | RD2-score3=17
| RD2-seed4= | RD2-team4=Navy | RD2-score4=5

| RD5-seed1= | RD5-team1=California | RD5-score1=14
| RD5-seed2= | RD5-team2=UCLA | RD5-score2=11

| RD5b-seed1= | RD5b-team1=Stanford | RD5b-score1=7
| RD5b-seed2= | RD5b-team2=USC | RD5b-score2=10

| RD1-seed1= | RD1-team1=Long Beach State | RD1-score1=13| RD1-seed2= | RD1-team2=UC Irvine | RD1-score2=10

| RD1b-seed1= | RD1b-team1=Arkansas–Little Rock (OT) | RD1b-score1=10| RD1b-seed2= | RD1b-team2=Navy | RD1b-score2=9
}}

 All-tournament team Kirk Everist, California''' (Most outstanding player)
Rich Ambidge, California
Zoltan Berty, USC
Jeff Brush, California
Fernando Carsalade, UCLA
Rob Carver, USC
Alexis Rousseau, UCLA

See also 
 NCAA Men's Water Polo Championship

References

NCAA Men's Water Polo Championship
NCAA Men's Water Polo Championship
1988 in sports in California
December 1988 sports events in the United States
1988